Schweller may refer to:
Schweller (card game), a nineteenth-century French trick-taking card game
Schweller (pipe organ), a name for the swell pedal of a pipe organ